"The Reason" is a song by American rock band Hoobastank. Released on January 26, 2004, as the second single from their second studio album of the same name, the power ballad is Hoobastank's most commercially successful single, peaking at number two on the US Billboard Hot 100 and number one on the US Modern Rock Tracks chart. In 2005, it was nominated for two categories at the 47th Grammy Awards: Song of the Year and Best Pop Performance by a Duo or Group with Vocals. Internationally, "The Reason" reached number one in Italy and peaked within the top 10 in ten other countries.

Chart performance
On March 20, 2004, the song debuted on the US Billboard Hot 100 at number 62, becoming that week's "Hot Shot Debut". It reached its peak of number two after 13 more weeks on the listing, giving the band their highest-charting US single. Though it remained on the chart for 38 issues, it was their last Hot 100 hit. The single peaked atop the Billboard Adult Pop Songs, Modern Rock Tracks, and Mainstream Top 40 charts. In Canada, it topped Radio & Records CHR/Pop, Hot AC, and Rock charts.

In Europe, "The Reason" reached number one on the Italian Singles Chart and the UK Rock & Metal Chart for two weeks each. On the UK Singles Chart, it debuted and peaked at number 12. Across the rest of Europe, the track entered the top 10 in Austria, the Czech Republic, Greece, the Netherlands, Norway, Sweden, Switzerland, and Wallonia. It was also successful in Oceania, reaching number seven in Australia and number five in New Zealand.

Music video
The music video for the song was directed by Brett Simon. In it, the band members stage a diversion so they can carry out the elaborate theft of a ruby gem from a pawnshop, but those facts are only clear after enough of the action unfolds: nothing is as it seems. At the beginning of the video, a woman gets hit by a car driven by vocalist Doug Robb. After the "accident", while everyone's attention is diverted, Chris Hesse and Dan Estrin execute the heist. The viewer then realizes that she was in on the operation, as she gets up and rides off with an accomplice (Markku Lappalainen) on a motorcycle at the end. The presumed owner of the pawnshop displays a look of realization, and the song ends with the band admiring their new acquisition, holding it up to the light and projecting red light-rays onto the ceiling. The accident's "victim" is also present. They then hear police sirens from above, and the video fades out.

Their music video "Same Direction" is intended as both a sequel and a prequel to the video for "The Reason" and further details the band member's roles, as well as showing the trouble they bring down on themselves from law enforcement.

Track listings

US promo CD
 "The Reason" – 3:52
 "The Reason" (call out) – 0:10

UK 7-inch single
A. "The Reason" – 3:53
B. "Out of Control" (live) – 2:52

European CD single
 "The Reason" (album) – 3:52
 "Meet Hoobastank" – 5:49

European enhanced CD single 1
 "The Reason" – 3:52
 "Meet Hoobastank" – 5:49
 "Crawling in the Dark" (acoustic) – 3:09
 "The Reason" (video)

European enhanced CD single 2
 "The Reason" – 3:52
 "Out of Control" (live) – 2:52
 "Running Away" – 2:59
 "The Reason" (video) – 3:52

Credits and personnel
Credits are adapted from the US promo CD liner notes and The Reason booklet.

Studios
 Recorded at Bay 7 Studios (Valley Village, Los Angeles) and Sparky Dark Studios (Calabasas, California)
 Strings recorded at Capitol Studios (Hollywood, California)
 Mixed at Image Recording (Hollywood, California)
 Mastered at Precision Mastering (Los Angeles)

Personnel

 Daniel Estrin – music, guitar
 Douglas Robb – lyrics, vocals
 Markku Lappalainen – bass
 Chris Hesse – drums
 Howard Benson – production

 Mike Plotnikoff – recording
 Casey Stone – recording (strings)
 Chris Lord-Alge – mixing
 Deborah Lurie – string arrangement
 Tom Baker – mastering

Charts

Weekly charts

Year-end charts

All-time charts

Certifications

Release history

In popular culture
The song appeared on the PlayStation 2 music video game SingStar.

References

2000s ballads
2003 songs
2004 singles
Hoobastank songs
Island Records singles
Mercury Records singles
Music videos directed by Brett Simon
Number-one singles in Italy
Pop ballads
Rock ballads
Song recordings produced by Howard Benson
Songs written by Dan Estrin
Songs written by Doug Robb